Mats Gustafsson (born 23 October 1957) is a Swedish former cyclist. He competed in the individual road race and team time trial events at the 1980 Summer Olympics.

References

External links
 

1957 births
Living people
People from Uddevalla Municipality
Swedish male cyclists
Olympic cyclists of Sweden
Cyclists at the 1980 Summer Olympics
Sportspeople from Västra Götaland County
20th-century Swedish people